The 2016–17 Galatasaray season was the club's 113rd in existence and 59th consecutive season in the Süper Lig. The club were aiming for an unprecedented 21st Turkish title, after finishing the Süper Lig in sixth place in the previous season.

In Europe, Galatasaray was not present in any competition, having been barred from entering in the previous season by UEFA. They did however compete domestically in both the Turkish Cup and the Turkish Super Cup.

This article shows statistics of the club's players in the season, and also lists all matches the club played in during the season. The season covered a period from 1 July 2016 to 30 June 2017.

Club

Technical Staff

Board of Directors

Medical Staff

   Gürbey Kahveci

Grounds

Kit
Uniform Manufacturer: Nike

Chest Advertising's: Nef

Back Advertising's: Garenta

Arm Advertising's: Permolit

Short Advertising's: Coca-Cola

Sponsorship
Companies that Galatasaray had sponsorship deals with during the season included the following.

Season overview

 On 27 May 2016, it was announced that midfielder Emre Çolak had been transferred to Deportivo La Coruña.
 On 28 May 2016, Galatasaray revealed its pre-season summer camp schedule. The camp schedule for the Galatasaray professional football team prior to the next football season began on 1 July at their training ground, Florya Metin Oktay Sports Complex and Training Center.
 On 22 June 2016, it was announced that Galatasaray had begun official negotiations regarding the transfer of Serdar Aziz from Bursaspor. The original bid was reported as €4.5 million, with Aziz set to receive an annual salary of €2 million.
 On 27 June 2016, it was announced that the contracts of Bilal Kısa, Furkan Özçal and Sercan Yıldırım had been terminated by Galatasaray.
 On 28 June 2016, it was announced that Emre Can Coşkun had been sold to Göztepe for a transfer fee of €50,000.
 On 29 June 2016, it was announced that José Rodríguez had been sold to Mainz 05 for a €2.145 million transfer fee.
 On 30 June 2016, it was announced that Galatasaray would play a friendly match against Manchester United on 30 July in Gothenburg, Sweden.
 On 30 June 2016, it was announced that Galatasaray had reached a deal with Jan Olde Riekerink for the 2016–17 season.
 On 4 July 2016, it was announced that defender Sabri Sarıoğlu had extended his contract until 2017.
 On 4 July 2016, it was announced that midfielder Hamit Altıntop had extended his contract until 2017.
 On 4 July 2016, it was announced that Galatasaray had begun official negotiations regarding the transfer of Turkish winger Emrah Başsan. Galatasaray did not pay a transfer fee for the footballer, and Başsan was set to earn a salary of €400,000 per year.
 On 8 July 2016, it was announced that striker Volkan Pala had been loaned out on a two-year loan to Çaykur Rizespor.
 On 12 July 2016, it was announced that Alex Telles had been sold to Porto for a €6.5 million transfer fee.
 On 24 July 2016, it was announced that Umut Bulut, Olcan Adın, Endoğan Adili and Tarık Çamdal had not been included in the second camp squad.
 On 1 August 2016, it was announced that Galatasaray had begun official negotiations regarding the transfer of Turkish striker Eren Derdiyok.
 On 1 August 2016, it was announced that the friendly match between Galatasaray and Atlético Madrid has been cancelled on request.
 On 5 August 2016, it was announced that Galatasaray had transferred Eren Derdiyok from Kasımpaşa. The original bid was reported as €4 million, with Derdiyok set to receive an annual salary of €2.15 million.
 On 7 August 2016, it was announced that Galatasaray had begun official negotiations regarding the transfer of Turkish midfielder Tolga Ciğerci.
 On 8 August 2016, it was announced that Galatasaray had transferred in Tolga Ciğerci from Hertha BSC. The original bid was reported as €3 million, with Tolga set to receive an annual salary of €2 million.
 On 8 August 2016, it was announced that Galatasaray had begun official negotiations regarding the transfer of Belgian defender Luis Pedro Cavanda.
 On 8 August 2016, it was announced that Galatasaray had transferred in Luis Pedro Cavanda from Trabzonspor. The original bid was reported as €1.8 million, with Cavanda set to receive an annual salary of €875,000.
 On 9 August 2016, a jersey sponsorship agreement was made between Galatasaray and Nef.
 On 17 August 2016, it was announced that Blerim Džemaili had been sold to Bologna for €1.3 million.
 On 23 August 2016, it was announced that Galatasaray had begun official negotiations regarding the loan of Portuguese midfielder Josué. Josué was set to receive an annual salary of €700,000.
 On 29 August 2016, it was announced that the contract of Olcan Adın had been terminated by Galatasaray.
 On 30 August 2016, it was announced that Galatasaray had begun official negotiations regarding the loan of Icelandic midfielder Kolbeinn Sigþórsson for €700,000. Sigþórsson was set receive an annual salary of €1.2 million. Galatasaray also had a buy-out option for €3.8 million.
 On 31 August 2016, it was announced that Galatasaray had begun official negotiations regarding the transfer of midfielder Nigel de Jong. De Jong was set to receive an annual salary of €2.5 million.
 On 31 August 2016, it was announced that the contract of Umut Bulut had been terminated by Galatasaray.
 On 31 August 2016, it was announced that Tarık Çamdal had been loaned out to Eskişehirspor for the rest of the season.
 On 31 August 2016, it was announced that Ryan Donk had been loaned out to Real Betis for the rest of the season.
 On 9 August 2016, a jersey sponsorship agreement was made between Galatasaray and Permolit.
 On 29 December 2016, it was announced that the contract of Kolbeinn Sigþórsson had been terminated by Galatasaray.
 On 3 January 2017, it was announced that Salih Dursun had been loaned out to Antalyaspor for the rest of the season.
 On 4 January 2017, it was announced that the contract of Hamit Altıntop had been terminated by Galatasaray.
 On 4 January 2017, it was announced that Emrah Başsan had been loaned out to Fortuna Sittard for the rest of the season.
 On 6 January 2017, it was announced that the contract of Lucas Ontivero had been terminated by Galatasaray.
 On 6 January 2017, it was announced that the contract of Jem Karacan had been terminated by Galatasaray.
 On 10 January 2017, it was announced that Galatasaray had begun official negotiations regarding the transfer of winger Garry Rodrigues. Rodrigues was set to receive an annual salary of €1.35 million.
 On 11 January 2017, it was announced that Umut Gündoğan had been loaned out to Manisaspor until the end of the season.
 On 11 January 2017, it was announced that Galatasaray had begun official negotiations regarding the transfer of Turkish defender Ahmet Yılmaz Çalık for €2.5 million. Ahmet was set to receive an annual salary of €0.9 million.
 On 15 February 2017, it was announced that had Galatasaray dismissed manager Jan Olde Riekerink.
 On 15 February 2017, it was announced that Galatasaray had reached a deal with Igor Tudor as new manager until the 2017–18 season.

Players

Squad information

Transfers

In

Total spending:  €20,000,000

Out

Total income:  €10,150,000

Expenditure:  €9,850,000

Competitions

Overall

Pre-season, mid-season and friendlies

Turkish Super Cup

Süper Lig

League table

Results summary

Results by round

Matches

Turkish Cup

Statistics

Squad statistics

Goals
Includes all competitive matches. In the case of a tie in total number of goals, players with more goals in Süper Lig are ranked higher, followed by Super Cup and Turkish Cup goals respectively. If all stats are the same, then the younger player is ranked higher.

Disciplinary record

Overall

Attendances

 Sold season tickets: 20,000 & 197 suites = 22,167

See also
 2016–17 Süper Lig
 2016–17 Turkish Cup
 2016 Turkish Super Cup

References

External links
Galatasaray Sports Club Official Website 
Turkish Football Federation - Galatasaray A.Ş. 
uefa.com - Galatasaray AŞ

2016-17
Turkish football clubs 2016–17 season
2016 in Istanbul
2017 in Istanbul
Galatasaray Sports Club 2016–17 season